The 4th Congress of the Philippines (Filipino: Ikaapat na Kongreso ng Pilipinas), composed of the Philippine Senate and House of Representatives, met from January 27, 1958, until December 13, 1961, during the second term of President Carlos P. Garcia.

Sessions
First Regular Session: January 27 – May 22, 1958
First Special Session: May 26 – June 7, 1958
Second Regular Session: January 26 – May 21, 1959
Second Special Session: June 1 – July 4, 1959
Third Regular Session: January 25 – May 19, 1960
Third Special Session: June 14 – July 18, 1960
Fourth Regular Session: January 23 – May 18, 1961
Informal Meeting: July 15, 1961
Joint Session: December 12–13, 1961

Legislation
The Fourth Congress passed a total of 1,401 laws. (Republic Act Nos. 2050 – 3450)

Major Legislation

Leadership

Senate
President of the Senate:
Eulogio A. Rodriguez, Sr. (NP)
Senate President Pro-Tempore:
Fernando Lopez  (NP)
Majority Floor Leader:
Cipriano P. Primicias, Sr. (NP)
Minority Floor Leader:
Ferdinand E. Marcos (LP)
Ambrosio Padilla (LP)

House of Representatives
Speaker:
Daniel Z. Romualdez (NP, 4th District Leyte)
Speaker Pro-Tempore:
Constancio E. Castañeda (NP, 2nd District Tarlac)
Majority Floor Leader:
Jose M. Aldeguer (NP, 5th District Iloilo)
Minority Floor Leader:
Cornelio T. Villareal (LP, 2nd District Capiz)

Members

Senate

Notes

House of Representatives

See also
Congress of the Philippines
Senate of the Philippines
House of Representatives of the Philippines
1957 Philippine general election
1959 Philippine general election

External links

Further reading
Philippine House of Representatives Congressional Library

04
Third Philippine Republic